Frederick John Thompson (May 21, 1935 – July 7, 2010) was a commercial fisherman, trapper and political figure in Saskatchewan. He represented Athabasca from 1975 to 1995 in the Legislative Assembly of Saskatchewan as a New Democratic Party (NDP) member.

He was born in Big River, Saskatchewan and later moved to Buffalo Narrows, where he fished, trapped and operated a mink ranch. He was a three-time Saskatchewan boxing champion and coached hockey, baseball and gymnastics. Later in life, Thompson was a professional golf instructor.

He served in the Saskatchewan cabinet as Minister of Economic Development. Thompson was defeated by Buckley Belanger when he ran for reelection to the provincial assembly in 1995.

He died on 7 July 2010.

References 

Saskatchewan New Democratic Party MLAs
1935 births
2010 deaths
Canadian male boxers